Lust and Loathing is the third album by the Unguided, released on 2 February 2016 by Napalm Records, and the last to feature original co-frontman and guitarist Roland Johansson. The album was recorded at Studio Haga in Kinna, Sweden, in 2015.

Writing and recording
Four days before the initial release of the album, the band released their first single from the album, "Enraged", on January 29, 2016.

Track listing
All tracks composed by Roger Sjunnesson, Roland Johansson, Henric Liljesand & Richard Schill. All lyrics written by Richard Sjunnesson.

Personnel 
The Unguided
 Richard Sjunnesson - unclean vocals
 Roland Johansson - clean vocals, lead guitar
 Roger Sjunnesson - rhythm guitar, keyboards, programming
 Henric Liljesand - bass guitar
 Richard Schill - drums, percussion

Production
 Produced, mixed and engineered by Jacob hansen and The Unguided
 Artwork by Kuang Hong
 Artwork layout design by Gustavo Sazes

References

2016 albums
The Unguided albums
Albums produced by Jacob Hansen